Four Tops Second Album (also known as Second Album) is a 1965 R&B studio album by vocal quartet the Four Tops. The album, released on the Motown record label, reached No. 3 on Billboard's Black Albums chart and No. 20 on the Billboard Top LPs chart. The album contains three hit singles. "I Can't Help Myself (Sugar Pie, Honey Bunch)" reached No. 1 on both the Black Singles and Pop Singles charts, while "It's the Same Old Song" reached No. 2 and No. 5 respectively, and "Something About You" reached No. 9 and No. 19. In 1990, Motown bundled the Four Tops' first two albums together in a release titled Four Tops/Four Tops Second Album.

Track listing
All songs composed by Holland–Dozier–Holland (Brian Holland, Lamont Dozier, and Eddie Holland), unless otherwise noted.
Side 1
"I Can't Help Myself" – 2:45
"Love Feels Like Fire" – 2:08
"Is There Anything That I Can Do" (Warren "Pete" Moore, Smokey Robinson, Ronald White) – 3:07
"Something About You" – 2:44
"It's the Same Old Song" – 2:51
"Helpless" – 2:46
Side 2
"Just as Long as You Need Me" – 3:12
"Darling, I Hum Our Song" – 2:44
"I Like Everything About You" – 2:21
"Since You've Been Gone" – 2:33
"Stay in My Lonely Arms" – 2:21
"I'm Grateful" (Eddie Holland, Cleo Drake, George Fowler) – 2:37

Personnel

Performance
 Levi Stubbs – lead vocals (except tracks 2 and 11); backing vocals (tracks 2 and 11)
 Abdul Fakir – backing vocals
 Renaldo Benson – backing vocals
 Lawrence Payton – backing vocals (except tracks 2 and 11); lead vocals (tracks 2 and 11); keyboard
 The Andantes – backing vocals
 Instrumentation by the Funk Brothers

References

External links
 Four Tops' Second Album at MTV, with lyrics
 Four Tops - Second Album (1965) album review by Ron Wynn, credits & releases on AllMusic
 Four Tops - Second Album (1965) album releases & credits on Discogs
 Four Tops - Second Album (1965) album to be listened as stream on Spotify

Four Tops albums
1965 albums
Albums produced by Brian Holland
Albums produced by Lamont Dozier
Motown albums
Albums recorded at Hitsville U.S.A.
Albums produced by Smokey Robinson